Baw Baw Ka Htaw is a 2018 Burmese comedy film directed by Ko Pauk and starring Myint Myat, Hsu Eaint San, Shwe Thamee, Mone, Joker, Khin Hlaing and Yaza Ne Win performed in this film. The film was produced by Lavender Production and which premiered in Myanmar cinemas on 13 July 2018.

Cast
Myint Myat  as Baw Baw Pi
Joker as Baw Baw Kaw
Khin Hlaing as Baw Baw Ku
Hsu Eaint San as Moe Swe
Shwe Thamee as Saung Wai
Mone as Nway War
Yaza Ne Win

References

External links

Baw Baw Ka Htaw on Myanmar-Cinema 

2018 films
2010s Burmese-language films
Burmese comedy films
Films shot in Myanmar
2018 drama films